Opuwo is the capital of the Kunene Region in north-western Namibia. The town is situated about 720 km north-northwest from the capital Windhoek, and has a population of 20,000. It is the commercial hub of the Kunene Region.

Economy and infrastructure
Opuwo is situated at the intersection of the C41 and C43. There is a small airfield in town, Opuwo Airport.

Putuavanga Senior Secondary School in town is among the best government schools in Kunene Region. There is also the Opuwo Primary School  39 teachers and 1,200 learners.

There are the following organizations and offices in the town: Opuwo Police Station, Opuwo District Hospital, Ministry of Home Affairs (Department of Civic Affairs / Regional Civic Registration Office / Kunene Region) and Opuwo Department of Works. There is a Christian church.

Politics
Opuwo is governed by a town council that has seven seats.

The 2015 local authority election was narrowly won by the SWAPO party, which gained four seats (1,593 votes). The remaining three seats went to the Democratic Turnhalle Alliance (DTA) with 1,504 votes. The 2020 local authority election was won by the Popular Democratic Movement (PDM, the new name of the DTA). It obtained 1,376 votes and gained four seats. SWAPO was the runner-up and gained the remaining three seats with 1,127 votes.

History

Etymology
The name Opuwo was given by the commissioner of Ondangwa, Hugo Hahn, who came in search of land to build an office. Upon his arrival, he asked local headmen to give him land where he could build an office. The headmen gave him a small plot, and when the headmen tried to give him more land, Mr. Hahn responded saying "Opuwo (it’s enough for me). I don’t want any more land". That is how Opuwo got its name. The local residents of Opuwo called it Otjihinamaparero at the time, and some still call it that.

Hugo Hahn called the land "Ohopoho Otjitopora", which means "they see the bore hole and their water comes out".  The name Otjihinamaparero was changed to Opuwo in 1974 due to orthographic reform.

Colonial administration
The first office to be established in the Kaokoland area was the colonial administrator in Swartbooisdrift on the banks of the Kunene River. This was the administrative centre of the area from 1925 to 1939. Afterwards, administrative control of the area shifted to Ohopoho, later called Opuwo.

The police station in Swartbooisdrift was run by Sergeant Herbert, and his aim was to receive the Angola Boers who had trekked to Angola out of refusal to accept the British government in South Africa. Sergeant Basson took over the office at Swartbooisdrift, and excavated Opuwo's first bore hole. Basson had the nickname “Katjiriamakaja” (a person who eats tobacco).

Culture

The Opuwo Town Council hosts the annual Opuwo Trade Fair, which was launched in 2012. The festival combines a modern business exhibition with cultural performances, live shows and entertainment. Opuwo Trade Fair takes place in the month of May.

People from Opuwo
Pieter de Villiers, former town councillor

References

External links

 https://ehc731.wixsite.com/opuwo/blank
 https://kunenerc.gov.na/
Opuwo website

Populated places in the Kunene Region
Towns in Namibia